Mercurial is the third studio album by Australian folk musician Vera Blue (the second under the name Vera Blue). It was released on 28 October 2022 through Island Records Australia.
 
Upon announcement on 31 August 2022, Vera Blue said "This body of work has been a long time coming and tells the stories of my life since Perennial came into the world. This album is colourful, emotional, personal, chaotic, passionate, transformative and beautiful and most of all, mercurial."
 
The album will be supported by the Mercurial 2022 Australian Tour, commencing on the Gold Coast on 3 November 2022.

Reception
Bryget Chrisfield from Beat Magazine said "Mercurial intersperses soul-searching ballads with electropop bangers for dancing the hurt away." Chrisfiend ended the review saying, "her vocals are perennially flawless and, throughout the deeply personal Mercurial, Pavey embraces vulnerability as a superpower."

Zoë Radas form Stack Magazine said "Mercurial has been crafted with the stage in mind; it's changeable and volatile like its namesake, full of thick bass and synths, and imbued with an urgent spirit."

Track listing

Personnel
Musicians
 Celia Pavey – vocals
 Andy Mak – programming (all tracks), synthesizer (1–9), bass guitar (3, 4), piano (4, 6, 8–10), drums (5, 7), guitar (7); background vocals, strings (10)
 Thom Mak – guitar (tracks 1, 4, 5, 7), synthesizer (1–3, 5–8, 10), bass guitar (3), background vocals (10)
 Billy Johnston – programming, synthesizer (4)
 Steve Solomon – synthesizer (9)

Technical
 Stuart Hawkes – mastering
 Scott Horscroft – mixing (1–3, 5–10)
 Mark Rankin – mixing (4)
 Andy Mak – engineering (1–10)
 Jackson Barclay – engineering (1, 5, 7, 10)
 Billy Johnston – engineering (4)
 Thom Mak – engineering (4)
 Steve Solomon – engineering (9)

Charts

References

 
2022 albums
Vera Blue albums